Ash Dargan is an indigenous Australian didgeridoo player. He is a member of the Larrakia people but did not find out about his aboriginality until he was 21. He teaches and performs all over the world. He is a former member of Coloured Stone, appearing on their 1999 album Rhythm of Nature.

Discography
Earth Rhythms (1998) Indigenous Australia
Wirrimbah (1998) Indigenous Australia
Trancescapes (1998) Indigenous Australia
Aphrodidjiac (1998) Indigenous Australia
Tribal Offerings (1998) Indigenous Australia
Ancient Spirit (1999) Indigenous Australia
Echoes of Ancient Didjeridu (1999) Indigenous Australia
Sun Always Dances (1999) Indigenous Australia
Woomera (1999) Indigenous Australia
Breath of Man (2000) Indigenous Australia
Ash Dust & Dirt (2000) Indigenous Australia
Demurru meditation (2000) Indigenous Australia
Pharaoh's Dreamtime (2001) Indigenous Australia
Stick Bones & Song Stones (2001) Indigenous Australia
Didgeridoo Made Easy – a beginners guide (2001) Indigenous Australia
Cool Jazz, Hot Didj (2001) Indigenous Australia
Spirit Dreams (2001) Indigenous Australia
Rasta (2001) Indigenous Australia
Kakadu (2002)
Wild Australia (2002) Indigenous Australia
Postcard From Ash Dargan (2002) Indigenous Australia
Territory – 13 Sacred Journeys into Dreamtime (2003) Soundsource Productions
Stories of Wind (2005) The Orchid
Very Best of Ash Dargan (2006) Indigenous Australia

With Don Emilio Fernandez De La Vega
Passions of Flamenco & Didjeridu (1998) Indigenous Australia

With Nigel Pegrum
Wirrigan (1999) Indigenous Australia

With Coloured Stone
Rhythm of Nature (1999) CAAMA

With David Hudson
Indigenous Rhythms 2000, with David Hudson (2000) Sony

With Oscar Serrallach
Meridian – Ancestral Roots – with Oscar Serrallach (2002) Soundsource Productions

See also

List of didgeridoo players

References

External links
The Live Music Report An Utterly Ab-Original Journey Through Global Sound
OnHamptonRoads A Journey into Dreamtime

Indigenous Australian musicians
Musicians from the Northern Territory
Didgeridoo players
Living people
People from Darwin, Northern Territory
Year of birth missing (living people)